Buntin is a surname. Notable people with the surname include:

Alfred Buntin (1892–1953), American businessman and politician
Bill Buntin (1942–1968), American basketball player
Craig Buntin (born 1980), Canadian former pair skater
Melinda Beeuwkes Buntin, American health economist